The 2011 Abilene Christian Wildcats football team was an American football team that represented Abilene Christian University (ACU) as a member of the Lone Star Conference (LSC) during the 2011 NCAA Division II football season. In their seventh season under head coach Chris Thomsen, the Wildcats compiled an 8–3 record (7–1 against conference opponents). They were selected to the Division II playoffs, where they were defeated by Washburn in the first round, 52–49.

The team played its home games at Shotwell Stadium in Abilene, Texas.

Schedule

References

Abilene Christian
Abilene Christian Wildcats football seasons
Abilene Christian Wildcats football